Burkinabin C is a divanilloylquinic acid found in the root bark of Fagara zanthoxyloides (Zanthoxylum zanthoxyloides).

References 

Hydrolysable tannins
O-methylated natural phenols